Visions of Light is a 1992 documentary film directed by Arnold Glassman, Todd McCarthy and Stuart Samuels. The film is also known as Visions of Light: The Art of Cinematography.

The film covers the art of cinematography since the conception of cinema at the turn of the 20th century.  Many filmmakers and cinematographers present their views and discuss why the art of cinematography is important within the craft of filmmaking.

Synopsis
The film includes interviews with many modern-day directors of photography and cinematographers, who illustrate via examples their best work and the scenes from films that influenced them to pursue their art. These  subjects include Néstor Almendros, John Bailey, Conrad Hall, Michael Chapman, László Kovács.

Among the pioneers to whom they pay homage are Gregg Toland, Billy Bitzer, James Wong Howe and John Alton.  The practitioners also explain the origins behind many of their most indelible images in cinema history.

Cinematographer interviews
 Sandi Sissel
 Ernest Dickerson
 Michael Chapman
 Allen Daviau
 Caleb Deschanel
 Conrad Hall
 William A. Fraker
 John Bailey
 Néstor Almendros
 Vilmos Zsigmond
 Stephen H. Burum
 Charles Lang
 Sven Nykvist
 László Kovács
 James Wong Howe
 Haskell Wexler
 Vittorio Storaro
 John A. Alonzo
 Victor J. Kemper
 Owen Roizman
 Gordon Willis
 Bill Butler
 Michael Ballhaus
 Frederick Elmes

Filmography
The filmmakers discuss the following films:

 The Dickson Experimental Sound Film (1895)
 Repas de bébé (1895)
 L'Arrivée d'un train à la Ciotat (1895)
 The Kiss (1896)
 Le Spectre rouge (1907)
 The Birth of a Nation (1915)
 Intolerance (1916)
 The Cabinet of Dr. Caligari (1920)
 Way Down East (1920)
 Der Letzte Mann (1924)
 Ben-Hur (1925)
 Napoléon (1927)
 Sunrise: A Song of Two Humans (1927)
 The Crowd (1928)
 The Cameraman (1928)
 The Cocoanuts (1929)
 Applause (1929)
 The Locked Door (1929)
 Possessed (1931)
 Dr. Jekyll and Mr. Hyde (1931)
 Shanghai Express (1932)
 As You Desire Me (1932)
 What Price Hollywood? (1932)
 Red Dust (1932)
 Mystery of the Wax Museum (1933)
 Gold Diggers of 1933 (1933)
 Queen Christina (1933)
 Becky Sharp (1935)
 Peter Ibbetson (1935)
 Desire (1936)
 Camille (1936)
 Jezebel (1938)
 The Adventures of Robin Hood (1938)
 Midnight (1939)
 The Story of Vernon and Irene Castle (1939)
 The Wizard of Oz (1939)
 Gone with the Wind (1939)
 The Grapes of Wrath (1940)
 Rebecca (1940)
 The Sea Hawk (1940)
 The Long Voyage Home (1940)
 Citizen Kane (1941)
 How Green Was My Valley (1941)
 The Magnificent Ambersons (1942)
 Meet Me in St. Louis (1944)
 Mildred Pierce (1945)
 The Killers (1946)
 Out of the Past (1947)
 T-Men (1947)
 The Naked City (1948)
 Oliver Twist (1948)
 She Wore a Yellow Ribbon (1949)
 Young Man with a Horn (1950)
 Sunset Boulevard (1950)
 On the Waterfront (1954)
 The Big Combo (1955)
 The Night of the Hunter (1955)
 Picnic (1955)
 Sweet Smell of Success (1957)
 Touch of Evil (1958)
 Jules et Jim (1962)
 Lawrence of Arabia (1962)
 Hud (1963)
 Who's Afraid of Virginia Woolf? (1966)
 The Professionals (1966)
 Cool Hand Luke (1967)
 In Cold Blood (1967)
 The Graduate (1967)
 2001: A Space Odyssey (1968)
 Rosemary's Baby (1968)
 Easy Rider (1969)
 Midnight Cowboy (1969)
 The Conformist (1970)
 McCabe & Mrs. Miller (1971)
 The French Connection (1971)
 The Godfather (1972)
 Fat City (1972)
 Chinatown (1974)
 The Godfather Part II (1974)
 The Day of the Locust (1975)
 Jaws (1975)
 Dog Day Afternoon (1975)
 Taxi Driver (1976)
 Eraserhead (1977)
 Annie Hall (1977)
 Star Wars (1977)
 Days of Heaven (1978)
 Apocalypse Now (1979)
 Raging Bull (1980)
 E.T. the Extra-Terrestrial (1982)
 Blade Runner (1982)
 Mishima: A Life in Four Chapters (1985)
 Blue Velvet (1986)
 The Last Emperor (1987)
 Empire of the Sun (1987)
 The Unbearable Lightness of Being (1988)
 The Last Temptation of Christ (1988)
 Do the Right Thing (1989)
 Goodfellas (1990)

Reception
Visions of Light has an overall approval rating of 94% on Rotten Tomatoes.

Awards
Wins
 New York Film Critics Circle Awards: NYFCC Award; Best Documentary; 1993.
 Boston Society of Film Critics Awards: BSFC Award Best Documentary; 1993.
 National Society of Film Critics Awards: NSFC Award; Best Documentary; 1994.

Nominations
 American Cinema Editors: Eddie; Best Edited Documentary, Arnold Glassman; 1994.

See also
 Cinematographer Style (2006)
 No Subtitles Necessary: Laszlo & Vilmos (2008)

References

External links
 
 
 
  by Siskel and Ebert and The Movies 
 Visions of Light at Box Office Mojo
 

1992 films
1992 documentary films
Documentary films about cinematography
1990s English-language films
American independent films
Japanese documentary films
1992 independent films
1990s American films
American documentary films
1990s Japanese films